The Normandy campaign of 1449-1450  took place during the Hundred Years War when the kingdom of France undertook a military campaign to retake the Duchy of Normandy from the English. Following the decisive victory of the French at the battle of Formigny and after the fall of Cherbourg, the last English stronghold in Normandy, English control of Normandy was removed.

References
Nicolle, David. The Fall of English France 1449–53. Bloomsbury Publishing, 2012. 

1449 in England
1450 in England
1440s in France
1450s in France
Conflicts in 1449
Conflicts in 1450
Hundred Years' War, 1415–1453
Military history of Normandy
Military campaigns involving France